Charibert de Haspengau (555 – 636) was a Frankish nobleman, possibly a count. parents are unknown , Charibert is described as Charibert nobilis in Neustria.  No other information is available other than descriptions of his grandchildren (e.g., Lambertus, Bishop of Lyon), who are described as having "high rank and worthy of significant positions" within the palace.

Charibert married Wulfgurd of Hesbaye of unknown parentage.  They had four children:
 Robert I, Bishop of Tours
 Aldebert, a monk, possibly at Fontenelle Abbey
 Erlebert, Seigneur de Quernes
 An unnamed daughter.

Sources 
Medieval Lands Project, Chrodebert I
Gregory of Tours, The History of the Franks, Penguin Books, London 1974
Settipani, Christian, Les Ancêtres de Charlemagne, 2e édition revue et corrigée, éd. P & G, Prosopographia et Genealogica, 2015
Settipani, Christian. Addenda aux Ancêtres de Charlemagne, 1990
Europäische Stammtafeln (available on-line)

555 births
636 deaths
6th-century Frankish nobility
7th-century Frankish nobility
Sons of kings